Zabrus potanini is a species of ground beetle in the Himalayozabrus subgenus that is endemic to Gansu, China.

References

Beetles described in 1889
Beetles of Asia
Endemic fauna of Gansu